Agapito is both a given name and a surname. It is the Spanish and Italian version of  Agapitus.

Notable people with the name include:

Given name:
Pope Agapetus I (490-536), Bishop of Rome, known as Agapetos in contemporary sources.
Agapito Aquino (1939-2015), Filipino politician
Agapito Conchu, Filipino film director
Agapito Gómez (born 1963), Spanish boxer
Agapito Jiménez Zamora (1817–1879), Costa Rican politician
Agapito Lozada (1938–2011), Filipino swimmer
Agapito Mayor (1915–2005), Cuban baseball player
Agapito Sánchez (1970–2005), Dominican Republic boxer

Surname:
Julio García Agapito (died 2008), Peruvian environmentalist
Lourdes Agapito, Spanish computer scientist
Oliver Agapito (born 1973), Filipino basketball player

Nickname
Alejandro Garcia Padilla (1971-), Puerto Rican politician (nickname given to him by the Puerto Rican media)

Spanish masculine given names